Ustadon Ke Ustad is a 1998 Indian Hindi-language action film directed by T. L. V. Prasad, starring Mithun Chakraborty, Jackie Shroff, Madhoo, Vineetha, Mohan Joshi, Mushtaq Khan, Asrani, Avtar Gill, Govind Namdeo and Tiku Talsania.

Plot
Two friends are turned against each other, as a result of a plan concocted by their enemies.

Cast

Mithun Chakraborty as Vishwanath  
Jackie Shroff as Jai Kishan / King Crown
Madhoo as Kanchan
Vineetha as Sapna
Mohan Joshi as Pukhraj Mahadevan	
Mushtaq Khan as Detective / Cook
Tiku Talsania as Detective / Cook
Jack Gaud as Mahadevan's nephew
Avtar Gill as IG Gill		
Govind Namdeo as Rudra	
Asrani as John De Sousa(Jai Kishan friend)
Ram Mohan

Soundtrack

References

External links
 

1998 films
1990s Hindi-language films
Mithun's Dream Factory films
Films shot in Ooty
Indian action films
Films scored by Dilip Sen-Sameer Sen
1998 action films
Hindi-language action films